Patric Suter (born 17 May 1977) is a retired male hammer thrower from Switzerland. His personal best is 80.51 metres, achieved in September 2003 in Löffingen, is the current Swiss record.  Suter is also a five time national champion.  In December 2007, Suter officially retired from athletics after a dispute with the national governing body.  A member of the Hochwacht Zug club, Suter trained under the guidance of Vasiliy Sidorenko.

International competitions

References

1977 births
Living people
Swiss male hammer throwers
Athletes (track and field) at the 2004 Summer Olympics
Olympic athletes of Switzerland